Below are the results for the 2010 World Series of Poker.

Key

Results

Event 1: $500 Casino Employees No Limit Hold'em

 2-Day Event: Friday, May 28, 2010 to Saturday, May 29, 2010
 Number of Entries: 721
 Total Prize Pool: $324,450
 Number of Payouts: 72
 Winning Hand:

Event 2: $50,000 The Poker Player's Championship

 5-Day Event: Friday, May 28, 2010 to Tuesday, June 1, 2010
 Number of Entries: 116
 Total Prize Pool: $5,568,000 
 Number of Payouts: 16
 Winning Hand:

Event 3: $1,000 No Limit Hold'em

 4-Day Event: Saturday, May 29, 2010 to Tuesday, June 1, 2010
 Number of Entries: 4,345
 Total Prize Pool: $3,910,500
 Number of Payouts: 441
 Winning Hand:

Event 4: $1,500 Omaha Hi-Low Split-8 or Better

 3-Day Event: Sunday, May 30, 2010 to Tuesday, June 1, 2010
 Number of Entries: 818
 Total Prize Pool: $1,104,300 
 Number of Payouts: 81
 Winning Hand:

Event 5: $1,500 No Limit Hold'em

 3-Day Event: Monday, May 31, 2010 to Wednesday, June 2, 2010
 Number of Entries: 2,092
 Total Prize Pool: $2,824,200
 Number of Payouts: 216
 Winning Hand:

Event 6: $5,000 No Limit Hold'em Shootout

 3-Day Event: Tuesday, June 1, 2010 to Thursday, June 3, 2010
 Number of Entries: 358
 Total Prize Pool: $1,682,600 
 Number of Payouts: 36
 Winning Hand:

Event 7: $2,500 2–7 Triple Draw Lowball

 3-Day Event: Tuesday, June 1, 2010 to Thursday, June 3, 2010
 Number of Entries: 291
 Total Prize Pool: $669,300 
 Number of Payouts: 30
 Winning Hand:

Event 8: $1,500 No Limit Hold'em

 3-Day Event: Wednesday, June 2, 2010 to Friday, June 4, 2010
 Number of Entries: 2,341
 Total Prize Pool: $3,160,350 
 Number of Payouts: 243
 Winning Hand:

Event 9: $1,500 Pot Limit Hold'em

 3-Day Event: Thursday, June 3, 2010 to Saturday, June 5, 2010
 Number of Entries: 650
 Total Prize Pool: $877,500
 Number of Payouts: 63
 Winning Hand:

Event 10: $10,000 Seven Card Stud Championship

 3-Day Event: Thursday, June 3, 2010 to Saturday, June 5, 2010
 Number of Entries: 150
 Total Prize Pool: $1,410,000
 Number of Payouts: 16
 Winning Hand:

Event 11: $1,500 No Limit Hold'em

 3-Day Event: Friday, June 4, 2010 to Sunday, June 6, 2010
 Number of Entries: 2,563
 Total Prize Pool: $3,460,050
 Number of Payouts: 270
 Winning Hand:

Event 12: $1,500 Limit Hold'em

 3-Day Event: Friday, June 4, 2010 to Sunday, June 6, 2010
 Number of Entries: 625
 Total Prize Pool: $843,750
 Number of Payouts: 63
 Winning Hand:

Event 13: $1,000 No Limit Hold'em

 4-Day Event: Saturday, June 5, 2010 to Tuesday, June 8, 2010
 Number of Entries: 3,042
 Total Prize Pool: $2,737,800
 Number of Payouts: 324
 Winning Hand:

Event 14: $1,500 2–7 Draw Lowball

 3-Day Event: Saturday, June 5, 2010 to Monday, June 7, 2010
 Number of Entries: 250
 Total Prize Pool: $337,500
 Number of Payouts: 28
 Winning Hand:

Event 15: $10,000 Seven Card Stud Hi-Low Split-8 or Better Championship

 3-Day Event: Sunday, June 6, 2010 to Tuesday, June 8, 2010
 Number of Entries: 170
 Total Prize Pool: $1,598,000
 Number of Payouts: 16
 Winning Hand:

Event 16: $1,500 No Limit Hold'em Six Handed

 3-Day Event: Monday, June 7, 2010 to Wednesday, June 9, 2010
 Number of Entries: 1,663
 Total Prize Pool: $2,245,050
 Number of Payouts: 162
 Winning Hand:

Event 17: $5,000 No Limit Hold'em

 3-Day Event: Tuesday, June 8, 2010 to Thursday, June 10, 2010
 Number of Entries: 792
 Total Prize Pool: $3,722,400
 Number of Payouts: 72
 Winning Hand:

Event 18: $2,000 Limit Hold'em

 3-Day Event: Wednesday, June 9, 2010 to Friday, June 11, 2010
 Number of Entries: 476
 Total Prize Pool: $866,320
 Number of Payouts: 45
 Winning Hand:

Event 19: $10,000 2–7 Draw Lowball Championship

 3-Day Event: Wednesday, June 9, 2010 to Friday, June 11, 2010
 Number of Entries: 101
 Total Prize Pool: $949,400
 Number of Payouts: 14
 Winning Hand: J-10-9-8-4

Event 20: $1,500 Pot Limit Omaha

 3-Day Event: Thursday, June 10, 2010 to Saturday, June 12, 2010
 Number of Entries: 885
 Total Prize Pool: $1,194,750 
 Number of Payouts: 81
 Winning Hand:

Event 21: $1,500 Seven Card Stud

 3-Day Event: Thursday, June 10, 2010 to Saturday, June 12, 2010
 Number of Entries: 408
 Total Prize Pool: $550,800
 Number of Payouts: 40
 Winning Hand:

Event 22: $1,000 Ladies No Limit Hold'em Championship

 3-Day Event: Friday, June 11, 2010 to Sunday, June 13, 2010
 Number of Entries: 1,054
 Total Prize Pool: $948,600
 Number of Payouts: 117
 Winning Hand:

Event 23: $2,500 Limit Hold'em Six Handed

 3-Day Event: Friday, June 11, 2010 to Sunday, June 13, 2010
 Number of Entries: 384
 Total Prize Pool: $883,200
 Number of Payouts: 36
 Winning Hand:

Event 24: $1,000 No Limit Hold'em

 4-Day Event: Saturday, June 12, 2010 to Wednesday, June 16, 2010
 Number of Entries: 3,289
 Total Prize Pool: $2,960,100
 Number of Payouts: 342
 Winning Hand:

Event 25: $10,000 Omaha Hi-Low Split-8 or Better Championship

 3-Day Event: Saturday, June 12, 2010 to Monday, June 14, 2010
 Number of Entries: 212
 Total Prize Pool: $1,992,800
 Number of Payouts: 27
 Winning Hand:

Event 26: $2,500 No Limit Hold'em Six Handed

 3-Day Event: Monday, June 14, 2010 to Wednesday, June 16, 2010
 Number of Entries: 1,245
 Total Prize Pool: $2,863,500
 Number of Payouts: 126
 Winning Hand:

Event 27: $1,500 Seven Card Stud Hi-Low-8 or Better

 3-Day Event: Monday, June 14, 2010 to Wednesday, June 16, 2010
 Number of Entries: 644
 Total Prize Pool: $869,400
 Number of Payouts: 64
 Winning Hand:

Event 28: $2,500 Pot Limit Omaha

 3-Day Event: Tuesday, June 15, 2010 to Thursday, June 17, 2010
 Number of Entries: 596
 Total Prize Pool: $1,370,800
 Number of Payouts: 54
 Winning Hand:

Event 29: $10,000 Limit Hold'em Championship

 3-Day Event: Tuesday, June 15, 2010 to Thursday, June 17, 2010
 Number of Entries: 171
 Total Prize Pool: $1,607,400
 Number of Payouts: 18
 Winning Hand:

Event 30: $1,500 No Limit Hold'em

 3-Day Event: Wednesday, June 16, 2010 to Friday, June 18, 2010
 Number of Entries: 2,394
 Total Prize Pool: $3,231,900
 Number of Payouts: 243
 Winning Hand:

Event 31: $1,500 H.O.R.S.E.

 3-Day Event: Wednesday, June 16, 2010 to Friday, June 18, 2010
 Number of Entries: 828
 Total Prize Pool: $1,117,800 
 Number of Payouts: 80
 Winning Hand:  (Stud 8/OB)

Event 32: $5,000 No Limit Hold'em Six Handed

 3-Day Event: Thursday, June 17, 2010 to Saturday, June 19, 2010
 Number of Entries: 568
 Total Prize Pool: $2,669,600
 Number of Payouts: 54
 Winning Hand:

Event 33: $2,500 Pot Limit Hold'em/Omaha

 3-Day Event: Thursday, June 17, 2010 to Saturday, June 19, 2010
 Number of Entries: 482
 Total Prize Pool: $1,108,600
 Number of Payouts: 45
 Winning Hand:

Event 34: $1,000 Seniors No Limit Hold'em Championship

 3-Day Event: Friday, June 18, 2010 to Sunday, June 20, 2010
 Number of Entries: 3,142
 Total Prize Pool: $2,827,800
 Number of Payouts: 324
 Winning Hand:

Event 35: $10,000 Heads Up No Limit Hold'em Championship

 3-Day Event: Friday, June 18, 2010 to Sunday, June 20, 2010
 Number of Entries: 256
 Total Prize Pool: $2,406,400
 Number of Payouts: 32
 Winning Hand:

Event 36: $1,000 No Limit Hold'em

 4-Day Event: Saturday, June 19, 2010 to Tuesday, June 22, 2010
 Number of Entries: 3,102
 Total Prize Pool: $2,791,800
 Number of Payouts: 324
 Winning Hand:

Event 37: $3,000 H.O.R.S.E.

 3-Day Event: Saturday, June 19, 2010 to Monday, June 21, 2010
 Number of Entries: 478 
 Total Prize Pool: $1,319,280 
 Number of Payouts: 48
 Winning Hand: A-2-3-4-5 (Razz)

Event 38: $10,000 Pot Limit Hold'em Championship

 3-Day Event: Sunday, June 20, 2010 to Tuesday, June 22, 2010
 Number of Entries: 268 
 Total Prize Pool: $2,519,200
 Number of Payouts: 27
 Winning Hand:

Event 39: $1,500 No Limit Hold'em Shootout

 3-Day Event: Monday, June 21, 2010 to Wednesday, June 23, 2010
 Number of Entries: 1,397
 Total Prize Pool: $1,885,950
 Number of Payouts: 140
 Winning Hand:

Event 40: $2,500 Razz

 3-Day Event: Monday, June 21, 2010 to Wednesday, June 23, 2010
 Number of Entries: 365
 Total Prize Pool: $839,500
 Number of Payouts: 40
 Winning Hand: 7–5–4–3–2

Event 41: $1,500 Pot Limit Omaha Hi-Low Split-8 or Better

 3-Day Event: Tuesday, June 22, 2010 to Thursday, June 24, 2010
 Number of Entries: 847
 Total Prize Pool: $1,143,450
 Number of Payouts: 81
 Winning Hand:

Event 42: $1,500 No Limit Hold'em

 3-Day Event: Wednesday, June 23, 2010 to Friday, June 25, 2010
 Number of Entries: 2,521
 Total Prize Pool: $3,403,305
 Number of Payouts: 270
 Winning Hand:

Event 43: $10,000 H.O.R.S.E. Championship

 3-Day Event: Wednesday, June 23, 2010 to Friday, June 25, 2010
 Number of Entries: 241
 Total Prize Pool: $2,265,400
 Number of Payouts: 24
 Winning Hand:  (Hold'em)

Event 44: $2,500 Mixed Hold'em

 3-Day Event: Thursday, June 24, 2010 to Saturday, June 26, 2010
 Number of Entries: 507
 Total Prize Pool: $1,166,100
 Number of Payouts: 54
 Winning Hand:

Event 45: $1,500 No Limit Hold'em

 3-Day Event: Friday, June 25, 2010 to Sunday, June 27, 2010
 Number of Entries: 3,097
 Total Prize Pool: $4,180,950
 Number of Payouts: 423
 Winning Hand:

Event 46: $5,000 Pot Limit Omaha Hi-Low Split-8 or Better

 3-Day Event: Friday, June 25, 2010 to Sunday, June 27, 2010
 Number of Entries: 284
 Total Prize Pool: $1,334,800
 Number of Payouts: 27
 Winning Hand:

Event 47: $1,000 No Limit Hold'em

 5-Day Event: Saturday, June 26, 2010 to Wednesday, June 30, 2010
 Number of Entries: 3,128
 Total Prize Pool: $2,815,200
 Number of Payouts: 324
 Winning Hand:

Event 48: $2,500 Mixed Event (8-Game) 

 3-Day Event: Saturday, June 26, 2010 to Monday, June 28, 2010
 Number of Entries: 453
 Total Prize Pool: $1,041,900
 Number of Payouts: 48
 Winning Hand:

Event 49: $1,500 No Limit Hold'em

 3-Day Event: Monday, June 28, 2010 to Wednesday, June 30, 2010
 Number of Entries: 2,543
 Total Prize Pool: $3,433,050
 Number of Payouts: 270
 Winning Hand:

Event 50: $5,000 Pot Limit Omaha

 3-Day Event: Monday, June 28, 2010 to Wednesday, June 30, 2010
 Number of Entries: 460
 Total Prize Pool: $2,162,000
 Number of Payouts: 45
 Winning Hand:

Event 51: $3,000 Triple Chance No Limit Hold'em

 3-Day Event: Tuesday, June 29, 2010 to Thursday, July 1, 2010
 Number of Entries: 965
 Total Prize Pool: $2,663,400
 Number of Payouts: 90
 Winning Hand:

Event 52: $25,000 No Limit Hold'em Six Handed

 4-Day Event: Wednesday, June 30, 2010 to Saturday, July 3, 2010
 Number of Entries: 191
 Total Prize Pool: $4,536,250
 Number of Payouts: 18
 Winning Hand:

Event 53: $1,500 Limit Hold'em Shootout

 3-Day Event: Wednesday, June 30, 2010 to Friday, July 2, 2010
 Number of Entries: 548
 Total Prize Pool: $739,800
 Number of Payouts: 64
 Winning Hand:

Event 54: $1,000 No Limit Hold'em

 4-Day Event: Thursday, July 1, 2010 to Sunday, July 4, 2010
 Number of Entries: 3,844
 Total Prize Pool: $3,459,000
 Number of Payouts: 396
 Winning Hand:

Event 55: $10,000 Pot Limit Omaha Championship

 3-Day Event: Thursday, July 1, 2010 to Saturday, July 3, 2010
 Number of Entries: 346
 Total Prize Pool: $3,252,400
 Number of Payouts: 36
 Winning Hand:

Event 56: $2,500 No Limit Hold'em

 3-Day Event: Friday, July 2, 2010 to Sunday, July 4, 2010
 Number of Entries: 1,942
 Total Prize Pool: $4,466,600
 Number of Payouts: 198
 Winning Hand:

Event 57: $10,000 No Limit Hold'em Championship
 13-Day Event: Monday, July 5, 2010 to Saturday, July 17, 2010
 Final Table:  Saturday, November 6, 2010 to Tuesday, November 9, 2010
 Number of Entries: 7,319
 Total Prize Pool: $68,798,600
 Number of Payouts: 747
 Winning Hand:

Notes
Robert and Michael Mizrachi's appearance at the final table of the $50,000 Player's Championship is only the third time in WSOP history that two siblings faced each other at the final table of a WSOP event. Howard Lederer and Annie Duke both made it to the final table in 1998 in a Seven-Card Stud event and Ross and Barny Boatman made it to the final table in 2002 in a pot-limit Omaha event.

While the event is called the "Ladies Championship" the WSOP cannot ban men from participating.  In past years, a few men have played in the Ladies Championship, but in 2010 at least half a dozen and "some estimates on the floor are that the number of men who entered the event is in the double digits."  WSOP Communications Director Seth Palansky called the men "scumbags" and declared, “The good news is at the World Series of Poker, we have the right to refuse service to anyone at any time at any point that we deem, as operators of the event.”

David Warga became the first person to win the Casino Employees' Championship to win a second bracelet in an open event.

With the big blind at $240,000, Matt Keikoan was heads up with Daniel Idema with only $300,000 in chips.  He jokingly announced, “Greatest comeback in history right here,” before making a comeback to win the event.

References 
 

World Series of Poker
World Series of Poker Results, 2010